The Vijay Television Awards are an awards ceremony held to honour the cast and crew of Tamil soap operas and other shows which air on Vijay TV. This is the second time in the Tamil television industry where awards are given for performances in television serials and shows. The first edition of the awards show was held on 24 May 2014; the second one was held on 19 September 2015.

Nominations
Jurors select five nominees in each award category from among the shows that air on Vijay TV. The nominees are interviewed on Vijay TV and viewers are invited to cast their votes via text message or at the Vijay Television Awards website.

1st Annual Vijay Television Awards 
The 2014 Vijay Television Awards ceremony took place on 24 May 2014 at YMCA Nandanam, Chennai, and was telecast during the second week of June 2014. The show was hosted by Ma Ka Pa Anand, Jagan, Dhivyadharshini and Bhavana Balakrishnan.

Guests who attended the function included Sivakarthikeyan, Simran, Sangeetha, P. Vasu, D. Imman, Ambika, Radha and Yugi Sethu.

Saravanan Meenatchi won six awards, including, Favourite Actor Male and Favourite Actor Female for Senthil Kumar and Sreeja Chandran. Other winners were Office with four awards, Airtel Super Singer and  Jodi Number One with three awards, Deivam Thandha Veedu, Neeya Naana and Adhu Idhu Edhu with two awards, and Connexion with one award.

2nd Annual Vijay Television Awards
The second edition of Vijay Television Awards was held on 19 September 2015 at Nehru Indoor Stadium in Chennai. The award function was hosted by the anchors Jagan, Ma Ka Pa Anand, Priya and Kavin, Bhavana Balakrishnan The Vijay Television Awards song was released on 31 August. The show aired 27 September 2015.

3rd Annual Vijay Television Awards
The third edition of Vijay Television Awards was held on 6 May 2017 at Nehru Indoor Stadium in Chennai. The award function was hosted by the anchors Ramya Subramanian and Kavin. The show aired 21 May 2017.

4th Annual Vijay Television Awards
The award function was hosted by the anchors Dhivyadharshini and Ma Ka Pa Anand.

5th Annual Vijay Television Awards
The award function was hosted by the anchors Dhivyadharshini, Ma Ka Pa Anand, Kavin, Priyanka Deshpande, Ramya Subramanian and Bhavana Balakrishnan.

6th Annual Vijay Television Award
The award function was hosted by Dhivyadharshini, Ma Ka Pa Anand, Erode Mahesh and Priyanka Deshpande. It was telecasted on 18 April 2021.

7th Annual Vijay Television Award
The award function was hosted by Archana Chandhoke, Ma Ka Pa Anand, Erode Mahesh and Priyanka Deshpande. It was telecasted on 24 April 2022.

See also

 List of Asian television awards
 Vijay Awards
 Tamil Nadu State Film Awards
 International Tamil Film Awards
 Filmfare Awards South
 Cinema Express Awards
 Sun Kudumbam Awards (Tamil Television Awards)

References

External links

Tamil-language television awards
2014 Tamil-language television series debuts
Disney Star